One Wrench is Avail's fifth studio album, released in 2000. It was their first album for Fat Wreck Chords.

Critical reception
The Pittsburgh Post-Gazette called the album "another high-intensity collection from [the] undersung working-class heroes."

Track listing
 "Fast One" – 2:03
 "Taken" – 2:35
 "N30" – 2:16
 "Leveled" – 2:22
 "New Song" – 2:23
 "High Lonesome" – 3:02
 "Invisible" – 2:48
 "Union" – 2:23
 "Heron" – 2:29
 "Rest" – 1:54
 "C. Days" – 2:04
 "Bell" – 3:00
 "Leather" – 1:24
 "Old Dominion" – 2:37

Production
Engineer, Producer - Mark Miley
Mastered by Bill McElroy

References

Avail albums
2000 albums
Fat Wreck Chords albums